Altimax Broadcasting Company (Altimax) is a media and telecommunications company co-owned by Velarde, Inc. (VI) and Bethlehem Holdings, Inc. (BHI), a subsidiary of the Globe Group Retirement Fund. Altimax's media businesses are direct-broadcast satellite (DBBS) and Multipoint Multichannel Distribution Service (MMDS) wireless cable TV and broadband.

Altimax's broadcast and satellite frequency allocations, however, became a subject of legality issues that ensued in a scuffle between the company's shareholders and government regulator agency National Telecommunications Commission.

History
In 1999, The Velarde Group and its holding investment firm Velarde, Inc. (VI), led by former SkyCable executive vice president Mel Velarde, acquired Altimax Broadcasting Company and its broadcast assets. With this, Altimax was transformed into a wireless broadband service by applying for two licenses to the National Telecommunications Commission (NTC): A Direct Broadcast Satellite (DBBS) two-way service license, and Multi-point Microwave Distribution Service (MMDS) license utilizing 48 MHz within the 2.5 GHz band. The two licenses were under the Provisional Authority (PA). Altimax's original headquarters were located at Espana Blvd., Sampaloc, Manila.

However, in 2005, NTC stopped and revoked Altimax's licenses amid questioning the PA and the providingsion ofvices. Velarde sued NTC and, 2 years later, won the lawsuit which took legal protection for its licenses.

Acquisition by Globe; legal issues on alleged use of frequencies for other purposes
Bethlehem Holdings Inc., a subsidiary of Globe Telecom's Group Retirement Fund (GRF), signed an agreement with Radio Mindanao Network for the acquisition of Broadcast Enterprises and Affiliated Media (BEAM) in February 2009. 8 moEightths later (October 2009), BHI also signed an agreement with Velarde/Altimax for the expansion of its MMDS/DBS wireless services.

In contrast, the Ayala-led BHI acquired 39% of its stake in Altimax (with Velarde keeping 14%; while the remaining stake would be under Globe's parent companies, Ayala Corporation and SingTel) while taking over BEAM's majority stake.

The licenses were revoked again by the NTC due to complaints from several cable companies and even the Philippine Cable Television Association (PCTA), as well as "unpaid revenues" questioned by Senators Jinggoy Estrada and Antonio Trillanes IV.

Altimax used to propose a 10 kilowatt-V station using Channel 19 as its frequency. However, there is no word yet on the plans.

In 2019, the Court of Appeals (CA) denied BHI/Globe's petition, questioning an injunction that stopped its payment of an allegedly lowballed amount for the shares in Altimax.

See also
 Broadcast Enterprises and Affiliated Media

References

Mass media companies of the Philippines
Globe Telecom subsidiaries
Companies based in Pasig